NIAD Art Center (Nurturing Independence through Artistic Development), is a 501(c)(3) organization for artists with developmental and physical disabilities, founded in 1982 and based in Richmond, Contra Costa County, California. The organization provides studios, supplies, and gallery space.

Organization
NIAD stands for Nurturing Independence Through Artistic Development. NIAD Art Center has a 4,000 sq. ft. art studio in Richmond, California. The organization works with 70 artists every week; COVID protocols limit the number of artists working on-site to 20, but there is no capacity limit to the number of artists served in NIAD's Virtual Studios. Both studios are open five days per week. Some of the artists have physical disabilities; while others have developmental disabilities, and others have both. The artists enrolled at NIAD work with facilitators, who instruct them in multiple mediums: painting, fiber, ceramics, drawing, sculpture, printmaking, performance, sound recording, and digital media.

In addition to the studio space for artists, NIAD Art Center has an exhibition space where they present programming featuring the artists attending the center.

NIAD Art Center has a budget of around $600,000, as of 2012, a third of which is raised through donations and sales.

Artists associated

Exhibitions 
 The Genre Leaps (2018) - organized by Margaret Tedesco
 Virgins Virgining (2017) - organized by Micah Wood
 Avatar (2012) - curated by Justine Frischmann

References

External links
 NIAD Art Center Website

501(c)(3) organizations
Arts organizations based in the San Francisco Bay Area
Non-profit organizations based in the San Francisco Bay Area
Outsider art
Autism in the arts
Deafness arts organizations
Deaf education
Disability mass media
Disability organizations based in the United States
Charities for disabled people
Intellectual disability organizations
Art schools in California
Social welfare charities based in the United States
Richmond, California